Bahu Begum is a 1967 Hindi film directed by M. Sadiq, and starring  Pradeep Kumar, Meena Kumari and Ashok Kumar. The film has music by Roshan and lyrics by Sahir Ludhianvi. This film is known for songs, "Hum Intezaar Karenge Tera Qayamat Tak", sung by Mohammad Rafi and Asha Bhosle and "Duniya Kare Sawaal" by Lata Mangeshkar.
The film is a Muslim period drama set in the erstwhile Era of Lucknow woven around a mythical story of Bahut Begum's manor.

Plot
The film is set in Lucknow, where widower, Nawab Mirza Sultan lives with his daughter Zeenat Jahan in an old mansion, as he no longer has much wealth. They pretend to be wealthy, rent out part of the mansion, and the daughter desires luxuries that the father cannot afford. She visits a local jewellery shop to try on jewels (in pretence that she will buy) that she cannot afford. There a rich man, Nawab Sikandar Mirza, sees her and falls in love with her.  Zeenat, on the other hand, is in love with Nawab Yusuf, and they meet each other at a nearby Sufi shrine every Thursday.

In a twist of fate, Yusuf's uncle connivingly fixes her marriage with Nawab Sikandar Mirza, though she assumes it is with Yusuf. When she finds the truth, it is the day of marriage. Dressed as a bride she goes to the local shrine hoping to meet Yusuf there, as it's Thursday. But because Yousuf is out of town, he never shows up and Zeenat faints. On the other side, the marriage ceremony has commenced without her, as everyone believes that Bride (as per the custom of that time) is in her carriage behind the curtains, and her silence is equivalent to saying "I Do".  At Nawab Sikander Mirza's Haveli, the 'doli' comes empty. Unknown to him as to what happened, he and his sister Suraiya hide the fact that Bahu Begum isn't in it, but instead proclaim that she is ill, and thus no one is able to meet her.

Zeenat wakes up at the shrine past midnight and returns home but her disgraced and enraged father asks her to leave. She then goes to Yusuf's house to seek shelter, not knowing that he is out of town, and is told by his maternal Uncle, Mir Qurbani Ali, that Yusuf does not love her and has relocated to Allahabad for a few months. She then goes to her in-laws but is unable to speak freely with her 'husband' as he is angry and distracted. Devastated she runs away from there to go back to the nearby dargah (Sufi shrine), but trips and falls in front of a horse carriage being ridden by a courtesan, returning from her late night function. Zeenat wakes up at the home of the courtesan, Nazeeran Bai, who had rescued her from the road.

Her misfortune has taken her to a Kotha (bawdy-house). Her father and supposed husband, meanwhile, are hiding the truth and pretending all is well in order to keep their honour. But thereafter destiny brings her to that place only which is supposed to be her in-laws' house, i.e., the residence of Sikandar Mirza. She is sent there to sit in as "temporary wife" to facilitate the marriage of her sister-in-law Suraiya. When Zeenat arrives, Sikandar Mirza who along with his sister Suraiya is pleasantly surprised to see that the real bride or the Bahu Begum has finally come to her destination. Her arrival is a great sigh of relief for them and now they pleasantly show the Bahu Begum to the outsiders (females only due to the tradition of Muslim ladies' remaining behind the veil in the presence of the males not belonging to them).

But Zeenat tells Sikandar Mirza that when the marriage ceremony (Nikah) was being performed by the Qaazi (Muslim priest), she was not present at the place behind the curtain and she had not given her consent for the marriage as per the custom of the Nikaah and therefore, she is not his wife as per the law and the religion. However, she adds that she will never leave him, because his honour as well as the honour of his family is too important for her to take any such step, and she will remain the Bahu Begum of the household for the rest of her life.

Sikandar, being a thorough gentleman and a nice person, is happy with this small consolation too, and does not impose himself upon her as a husband. Suraiya is married off under the stewardship of her Bhaabhi, i.e., Zeenat, the highly respected Bahu Begum of the house. But the story gets another twist when Yusuf returns from outstation and learns that he has become a victim of his maternal uncle's conspiracy against him. Deeply hurt to know that his sweetheart has been married to another person but not able to accept the reality, he approaches Zeenat at the house of Sikandar Mirza. Zeenat tells him that though her marriage was not thoroughly executed and therefore she is unmarried in the eyes of the law and the religion, yet he should forget her as she will never compromise with the honour of Sikandar for the sake of her own pleasure. Their talks are overheard by Sikandar and then he makes a great sacrifice (by setting his mansion on fire and dying in it while making it look like that Zeenat died in it as well) to unite the lovers and ensure that they live happily together without the world knowing the truth.

Cast
 Ashok Kumar as Nawab Sikandar Mirza
 Pradeep Kumar as Yusuf
 Meena Kumari as Zeenat Jahan Begum
 Johnny Walker as Achchan
 Naaz as Suraiya
 Lalita Pawar as Naziran Bai
 Leela Mishra as Kariban 
 Zeb Rehman as Bilqees
 D. K. Sapru as Nawab Mirza Sultan
 Indira Bansal as Shagufta Begum
 Rajan Haksar as Nawab Pyare Miyan
 Helen as Courtesan

Music
The film has music by Roshan with lyrics by Sahir Ludhianvi:

References

External links
 
 

Indian drama films
1967 films
1960s Hindi-language films
Indian multilingual films
1960s Urdu-language films
Films set in Uttar Pradesh
1967 drama films
Films scored by Roshan
1960s multilingual films
Films about Islam
Films directed by M. Sadiq